The 26th New Brunswick Legislative Assembly represented New Brunswick between March 3, 1887, and December 30, 1889.

History

Government

Members 

Notes:

References 
The Canadian parliamentary companion, 1887, JA Gemmill

Terms of the New Brunswick Legislature
1886 establishments in New Brunswick
1890 disestablishments in New Brunswick